Lucinda Ebersole (March 12, 1956 – March 20, 2017) was a critic, editor  and writer of fiction in the literary scene of Washington, D.C. She is best known for her association with the literary journal Gargoyle Magazine, for which she has been co-editor along with Richard Peabody since 1997.  She has also edited various anthologies with Peabody, most notably the various books in their Mondo series. She also wrote an unpublished book entitled Málaga, which she described in 1998 as "a really weird little novel that is sort of 'transgendered' kind of poetry, kind of a novel."

Works
"Vermont: Home of Lousy Sex", Oyster Boy Review 9
"Suicide Notebook", Marlboro Review Winter/Spring No. 5

Cookbook of the Day (blog)
Lucindaville (blog)

Editor

Lucinda Ebersole, Richard Peabody, ed (1994) Coming to terms: a literary response to abortion, New Press,

References

External links
"Marguerite Duras", Rain Taxi, Vol. 3 No. 3, Fall 1998 (#11), www.raintaxi.com/online/1998fall/duras.shtml

Living people
American women novelists
1956 births
21st-century American women